Potoki may refer to the following places:

In Poland: 
Potoki, Tomaszów Lubelski County in Lublin Voivodeship (east Poland)
Potoki, Włodawa County in Lublin Voivodeship (east Poland)
Potoki, Pomeranian Voivodeship (north Poland)

In Slovenia:
Potoki, Jesenice, a settlement in the Municipality of Jesenice
Potoki, Kobarid, a settlement in the Municipality of Kobarid
Potoki, Semič, a settlement in the Municipality of Semič